Tokyo Tokyo city district (東京府東京市区, Tōkyō-fu-Tōkyō-shi-ku) was a constituency of the House of Representatives in the Imperial Diet of Japan (national legislature). Between 1902 and 1917 it elected eleven representatives by single non-transferable vote (SNTV). It was located in Tokyo and consisted of Tokyo City. Tokyo city often elected (anti-mainstream) Kenseitō, Kokumintō, Dōshikai and independent politicians while few Seiyūkai politicians (compared to the party's nationwide position) managed to be elected among the top five. Exceptions were Hatoyama Kazuo and his son Ichirō who in 1917 managed to achieve top tōsen, i.e. be elected with the highest vote. Other prominent representatives from the city of Tokyo include economist Taguchi Ukichi, Bukichi Miki, Kenseikai secretary-general in the 1920s and co-founder of Hatoyama's postwar Japan Democratic Party in 1954, and Tanomogi Keikichi, Minister of Communication in the 1930s and mayor of Tokyo.

In 1900 a change of the electoral law brought the transition to SNTV multi-member districts, the introduction of secret balloting and a reduction of the census requirement for suffrage. With the return to single-member districts in the election of 1920, Tokyo's wards were split up into 11 electoral districts.

Elected representatives

References 

Districts of the House of Representatives (Japan)